is a Japanese former professional boxer who competed from 2008 to 2019. He held the WBA interim flyweight title in 2013 and challenged for the WBC super-flyweight title in 2015.

Koki is the oldest of the three Eto brothers. His twin brother Taiki and their younger brother Shingo are all professional boxers.

Professional career

Eto won the interim WBA flyweight title from Thai Kompayak Porpramook via a twelve round unanimous decision in the latter's first title defence in Bangkok on August 1, 2013. "I can't believe it... I did it!' he exclaimed wearing the championship belt, "A dream can come true if you won't give it up!"

He would then lose the title to Yodmongkol Vor Saengthep on November 29, 2013 in his first title defense in Chonburi via twelfth-round knockout. He had suffered a fracture of the orbital floor in the first round of this fight.

On June 17, 2014, he scored a come-from-behind eighth-round knockout over Ardin Diale to seize the vacant OPBF flyweight title at the Korakuen Hall.

Professional boxing record

See also
List of flyweight boxing champions

References

Video references

External links

1988 births
Living people
Sportspeople from Okinawa Prefecture
Japanese male boxers
Flyweight boxers
Super-flyweight boxers
World flyweight boxing champions
World Boxing Association champions
21st-century Japanese people